Neusa Maria Faro (born February 18, 1945 in Sorocaba) is a Brazilian actress and dubber.

Television

Cinema

References

External links 

1945 births
Living people
People from Sorocaba
Brazilian television actresses
Brazilian telenovela actresses
Brazilian film actresses
Brazilian stage actresses